South–McDaniel–Patton Commercial Historic District is a national historic district located at Springfield, Greene County, Missouri. The district encompasses 12 contributing buildings in a commercial section of Springfield. The district developed between about 1872 and 1952, and includes representative examples of Late Victorian style architecture.  Notable buildings include the Crenshaw Hardware Co. building (c. 1884), Rogers & Baldwin Hardware Co. building (1872, c. 1891), John W. Williams Building (c. 1926), Queen City Meat Market building (c. 1884), and Phoenix Building (c. 1884).

It was added to the National Register of Historic Places in 2003.

References

Historic districts on the National Register of Historic Places in Missouri
Victorian architecture in Missouri
Buildings and structures in Springfield, Missouri
National Register of Historic Places in Greene County, Missouri